Vågsbygd is a borough and district in the city of Kristiansand which lies in the municipality of Kristiansand in Agder county, Norway. It is the largest borough and district in Kristiansand. Until 1965, Vågsbygd was a part of Oddernes municipality. The borough includes the districts of Flekkerøy, Voiebyen, Vågsbygd/Augland, and Slettheia. The Kristiansand Cannon Museum on Kroodden is an authentic fortress from World War II.

The Vågsbygd district includes many islands including Bragdøya, Andøya, Fredriksholm, and Flekkerøya (with Christiansø Fortress).

Attractions

Centre for the Protection of Vessels
On Andøya in Vågsbygd is the Bredalsholmen Shipyard and Preservation Centre, a Centre for protection of vessels at the former Bredalsholmen yard. Bredalsholmen Shipyard and Preservation Centre is a national hub for maintenance of museum ships and cherish worthy coastal culture, and a drydock with considerable capacity.

Cannon Museum

Kristiansand Cannon Museum was built by the German occupational forces during World War II. This is one of Norway's best preserved cannon plants from the war, complete with 45 mm cannon turrets, ammunition and charging facilities, workshops, offices and barracks.

Demographics and population
Vågsbygd borough is divided into four districts: Flekkerøy, Voiebyen, Slettheia, and Vågsbygd.

Neighborhoods
Neighborhoods in Vågsbygd:

Vågsbygd sentrum 

Vågsbygd sentrum is a neighbourhood in the city of Kristiansand in Agder county, Norway. It is the centrum of the borough of Vågsbygd. Vågsbygd sentrum is north of the neighborhood of Auglandskollen, south of Kjerrheia, east of Bjørklia, and west of Skyllingsheia.

Vågsbygd Mall is located here along with Vågsbygd High School, Fiskå Junior High, and Vågsbygd Elementary School. Vågsbygd Church is located here as well near the Vågsbygdtunet retirement home and a bus terminal for Nettbuss. Vågsbygd sentrum mostly consist of apartments.

Transportation

Photos

Politics

The 10 largest politics parties in Vågsbygd in 2015:

Education

Photos

Religion
There are 3 churches in Vågsbygd.
Flekkerøy Church is the only church at the island Flekkerøya. It was built in 1960 with a capacity of 375 people. The church was built out of concrete, there is a graveyard with the church.
Voie Church is located in Voiebyen, the church is the newest one in Vågsbygd, it was built in 1990 with no graveyard with the church. It has a capacity of 500 and is built by bricks.
Vågsbygd Church is located in Vågsbygd centrum and has a capacity of 650 people. There is no graveyard with the church and was built in 1967.
There is a Mormon church located at Slettheia.

Photos

Transportation

Road

County Road 456 is the main road in to Vågsbygd, the highway part starts with European route E39 in Hannevika and ends with a roundabout in Vågsbygd centrum. That part of the road is called the Vågsbygdport cause it goes threw a tunnel between the city and Vågsbygd. It was recently upgraded to 4 files in 2014. The old 456, goes from Hannevika around Blørstad and ends with Trekanten. County Road 456 continues there with the shore till Voiebyen before it goes west and ends in Søgne. From Flekkerøya, County Road 457 goes from the island threw the Flekkerøy Tunnel to the mainland and meets County Road 456 with Voie.

European Route E39 goes between Vågsbygd and Grim before exiting into Songdalen.

Bus

Bus in Vågsbygd is mostly served by line: M1, M2, M3, 05, 09 and 12

Economy 
Agriculture is largely left in Vågsbygd and replaced by residential and industrial areas. Vågsbygd has considerable industry, who has survived major changes. The largest employer is all the same Elkem Solar producing super clean Silicon for solar cells, which are located in premises that Elkem previous Ferrosilicon factory Fiskå Verk. On Andøya it established a significant and advanced mechanical industry which produces offshore and marine cranes and other marine equipment in Andøya Industrial Park.

Amfi Vågsbygd is the second largest mall in Kristiansand, after Sørlandssenteret. It is located in Vågsbygd Centrum with 45 stores and a part of the Amfi Mall chain.

Trekanten Mall is a smaller mall located in Trekanten off the highway County Road 456. It is located in Slettheia and the mall contains a grocery store, floweriest, hair salon, furniture store, gas station and a dentist office.

Fædrelandsvennen, the newspaper for Kristiansand and the Kristiansand Region used to be located on Fiskå from the 70s before it moved back to Kvadraturen in 2015.

Photos

References

Geography of Kristiansand
Boroughs of Kristiansand
Populated places in Agder